Domenico Xarth, O. Cist. (died 1471) was a Roman Catholic prelate who served as Bishop of Agrigento (1452–1471).

Biography
Domenico Xarth was ordained a priest in the Cistercian Order.
On 10 January 1452, he was appointed by Pope Nicholas V as Bishop of Agrigento. 
He served as Bishop of Agrigento until his death in 1471 in Rome.

While bishop, he was the principal co-consecrator of Dalmazio Gabrielli, Bishop of Siracusa.

References

External links and additional sources
 (for Chronology of Bishops)
 (for Chronology of Bishops) 

1471 deaths
15th-century Roman Catholic bishops in Sicily
Bishops appointed by Pope Nicholas V
Cistercian bishops